Mazar-e-Quaid, also known as Jinnah Mausoleum or the National Mausoleum, is the final resting place of Muhammad Ali Jinnah, the founder of Pakistan. Designed in a 1960s modernist style, it was completed in 1971, and is an iconic symbol of Karachi as well as one of the most popular tourist sites in the city. The mausoleum complex also contains the tomb of Jinnah's sister, Māder-e Millat ("Mother of the Nation") Fatima Jinnah, as well as those of Liaquat Ali Khan and Nurul Amin, the first and eighth Prime Ministers of Pakistan respectively. 
The tomb of Sardar Abdur Rab Nishtar, a stalwart of the Muslim League from Peshawar, is also located there.

Location
The mausoleum is located in a prominent and highly visible location in the Jamshed Quarters locality of central Karachi, along the northern edge of the colonial-era core at the end of Muhammad Ali Jinnah Road. The mausoleum is surrounded by a large garden laid out in a neo-Mughal style in the dense city, with large traffic rotaries at three of its four corners.

History 
Muhammad Ali Jinnah's death occurred in 1948, and his final resting place was marked by a large white marble slab that was raised on a plinth accessed by marble steps. In 1949, the Quaid-e-Azam Memorial Fund (QMF) was established, which received numerous suggestions for the establishment of a memorial in Jinnah's honor. By 1952, his mausoleum was capped by a small dome, with a cabinet that contained some of his personal effects along a wall near his grave. The site had an air of neglect which angered many. Fatima Jinnah and the QMF received numerous letters from concerned Pakistanis at the sad state of his tomb, and advocated for a more befitting monument to Jinnah.

In 1952, the QMF proposed to erect 4 monuments across Pakistan to Jinnah's memory - a mausoleum and mosque on the current site in central Karachi, a Dar-ul-Uloom religions school in Punjab, and a University of Science and Technology in East Pakistan. In 1954, an Indian architect was selected to design the mausoleum, but was later dismissed. In 1955, a Turkish architect was hired, but his plan was rejected as well.

In 1957, the  Government of Pakistan held an international competition to design a new mausoleum for Jinnah. The competition was initially won by British architect William Whitfield, of the Raglan Squire and Partners firm. The state's efforts to select a design were paralleled by the efforts of the Jinnah's sister, Fatima Jinnah, who sought input from the public in the design of a monument to her brother. Fatima Jinnah effectively vetoed the 1957 proposal, and assumed control of the QMF. She then commissioned architect Yahya Merchant, a Bombay based architect who was a personal friend of Jinnah, to design the monument.

President Ayub Khan laid the foundation stone for the monument on July 31, 1960. It was inaugurated by Yahya Khan on 18 January 1971. The gardens surrounding the mausoleum were not completed until December 24, 2000.

Proposed designs 
Numerous proposals were submitted by Pakistani citizens following independence – ranging from a shrine, to a neo-Mughal monument. The idealists suggestions directly from ordinary Pakistani citizens reflected the "radical utopianism" that swept through the Muslims of the subcontinent around the Pakistan Movement.

In 1954, an Indian architect was selected to design the mausoleum, but his design could not gain consensus among members of the QMF, and so was dismissed. In 1955, a Turkish architect was hired, but his plan was rejected as being "too elaborate," and "almost despotic." The QMF's mandate stalled as consensus over the design was lacking. Proposals from the Malay engineer and architect Ainuddin, suggested a complex reminiscent of a Sufi shrine, with mosques, libraries, school, restaurants, and shops to merge into the fabric of the city.

1957, the  Government of Pakistan held an international competition to design a new mausoleum for Jinnah. 6 of the 8 jurists were European modernist architects. The 1957 competition was won by William Whitfield of the modernist Reglan Squire and Partners firm. The plan called for an avant-garde neo-futurist mausoleum mounted on an elevated platform in a neo-Mughal garden, with a central parabola and pointed edges at its six corners reaching out "in an exuberant motion towards the sky." Following the 1958 coup of President Ayub Khan, who presented himself as a modernizer, the Whitfield-Squire proposal gained favor among the military elite, although public reception was not warm. Fatima Jinnah opposed Whitfield's plan on several fronts, including its design, its selection by an international rather than Pakistani jury, and the fact that it was awarded to a British national, which challenged the desire of Pakistanis for a de-colonial future.

Fatima Jinnah then assumed control of the design process, and chose the proposals of architect Yahya Merchant, a Bombay based architect who was a personal friend of Jinnah. Merchant's design was of a cuboid structure with a dome, clad in white marble. The monument was placed on an elevated platform, set in a 61-acre gardened hill looking over the city. The new design was praised by eminent professor Ahmad Hasan Dani as “not a slavish imitation of the old tradition. Actually it partakes of the Muslim spirit of the past but it is created to meet the new demand of the present in the technique of the present day.”

Architecture

The mausoleum was designed in the modernist style popular during the 1960s and 1970s, and has been termed a "traditional monument of a modernist period." It appears simple at a distance, but "exuberant in its use of material and complex in its detailing when viewed" closely. The use of white marble to suggest purity, and pure geometric forms, are designed to portray Jinnah as a larger-than-life figure. The location and style of the monument both serve to inspire passersby.

It is clad in white marble, and has curved arches and copper grills set on an elevated 54-square-meter platform.  The cool inner sanctum reflects the green of a four-tiered crystal chandelier given by the People's Republic of China.

In the interior of the grave complex, there are four graves in a row and one to the north. The one to the north, which is decorated with a series of black floral design at the base, belongs to Miss [Fatima Jinnah], Quaid-e-Azam's sister. Out of the four graves in a row, first extreme two belong to Liaquat Ali Khan, the first Prime Minister of Pakistan and Begum Ra'ana Liaquat Ali Khan lying side by side. The other extreme grave belongs to Sardar Abdur Rab Nishtar. In the middle lies buried Nurul Amin, who was the eighth Prime Minister of Pakistan. All these graves are made of Italian white marble, and they are of the box type, like the sarcophagus of Jinnah, placed on a triple base. But the sides of these graves are tapering inward while that of Jinnah are diverging outward. These are all plain graves, except that of Mohtarma Fatima Jinnah, which has a basal floral ornamentation.

In each wall is placed an entrance. Fifteen successive fountains lead to the platform from one side and from all sides terraced avenues lead to the gates. Around the mausoleum is a park fitted with strong beamed spot-lights which at night project light on the white mausoleum.

Significance
Official and military ceremonies take place here on special occasions, such as on 23 March (Pakistan Day), 14 August (Independence Day), 11 September (the anniversary of Jinnah's death) and 25 December (Jinnah's birthday). Dignitaries and officials from foreign countries also visit the mausoleum during official tours. On 14 August 2017, Pakistan's Independence Day, it was used for paying a tribute to Jinnah through 3d projection mapping show by 3D illumination.

Gallery

See also
 Wazir Mansion, Jinnah's birthplace in Karachi
 Governor-General's House, Jinnah's official residence in Karachi
 Quaid-e-Azam Residency, Jinnah's residence in Balochistan where he spent the last days of his life
 Jinnah House, Muhammad Ali Jinnah's house in Mumbai, India
 Quaid-e-Azam House, Muhammad Ali Jinnah's House in Karachi
 Flagstaff House, Muhammad Ali Jinnah's House in Karachi

References

External links

 

National symbols of Pakistan
Memorials to Muhammad Ali Jinnah
Mausoleums in Karachi
Tourist attractions in Karachi
Buildings and structures completed in 1970
National squares
Karachi
Heritage sites in Karachi